Condemned Bar is a former settlement, in Yuba County, California.

The former mining town of the California Gold Rush is registered as California Historical Landmark #572. Condemned Bar still appeared on maps as of 1947.

See also
 California Historical Landmarks in Yuba County, California

References

Former settlements in Yuba County, California
Mining communities of the California Gold Rush
Yuba River
California Historical Landmarks
Former populated places in California